Hồ Tấn Tài (born 6 November 1997) is a Vietnamese professional footballer who plays as a right-back for V.League 1 club Công An Hà Nội and the Vietnam national team.

Career statistics

Club

International

International goals

Honours
Becamex Bình Dương
Vietnamese National Cup: 2018

Vietnam U23/Olympic
Southeast Asian Games: 2019

Vietnam
AFF Championship runners-up: 2022
VFF Cup: 2022

References 

1997 births
Living people
Vietnamese footballers
People from Bình Định province
Association football defenders
V.League 1 players
Becamex Binh Duong FC players
2019 AFC Asian Cup players
Competitors at the 2019 Southeast Asian Games
Southeast Asian Games medalists in football
Southeast Asian Games gold medalists for Vietnam